The Annunciation, with Saint Emidius is an altarpiece by Italian artist Carlo Crivelli showing an artistic adaptation of the Annunciation. It was painted for the Church of SS. Annunziata in the Italian town of Ascoli Piceno, in the region of Marche, to celebrate the self-government granted to the town in 1482 by Pope Sixtus IV. The painting was removed to the Pinacoteca di Brera in Milan in 1811, but passed to Auguste-Louis de Sivry in 1820, and had reached England by the mid-19th century. It has been housed in the National Gallery in London since it was donated by Henry Labouchere, 1st Baron Taunton in 1864.

Themes
The light ray from the sky represents Mary receiving Jesus Christ into her womb by the Holy Spirit. The closed passage into the depth at the left and the flask of pure water in Mary's bedroom conventionally refer to Mary's virginity. The winged angel Gabriel is depicted with Saint Emidius, the patron saint of Ascoli Piceno carrying a model of that town. The apple in the foreground represents the forbidden fruit and associated fall of man. The cucumber symbolizes the promise of resurrection and redemption. The peacock symbolizes associated immortality, because it was believed that its flesh never decayed. An oriental carpet adorns the loggia on the first floor of the Mary's house.

The bottom portion of the painting features the coats of arms of Pope Sixtus IV and the local bishop, Prospero Caffarelli. The Latin words libertas ecclesiastica (church liberty) refer to the self-government of Ascoli Piceno under the general oversight of the Catholic Church.

In fringe theories, the halo of the Holy Spirit on the painting is sometimes interpreted as a UFO. According to historian Massimo Polidoro, the circular form in the sky is "a vortex of angels in the clouds, another frequent representation of God in Medieval and Renaissance sacred works of art". Polidoro calls the UFO explanation, "reinterpreting with the eyes of twenty-first-century Europeans the product of other cultures".

See also
 Ancient astronauts#Medieval and Renaissance art

References

1486 paintings
Paintings depicting the Annunciation
Collections of the National Gallery, London
Birds in art
Altarpieces
Books in art
Paintings by Carlo Crivelli